The Offences Against the State Acts 1939–1998 form a series of laws passed by the Irish Oireachtas.

Offences under the Act
The Act criminalises many actions deemed detrimental to state security. An organisation can be made subject to a suppression order under the act, after which being a member of or directing the activities of such an unlawful organisation becomes an offence. The opinion of a senior Garda can be admitted as prima facie evidence of membership. The act also criminalises obstruction of the President or government, secret societies in the police or army and unauthorised demonstrations in the vicinity of the Oireachtas, the Irish parliament.

Special Criminal Court
The Special Criminal Court is created and constituted by Part V of this statute. It is authorised by Article 38 of the Constitution of Ireland to hear indictable cases without a jury when ordinary courts are inadequate to secure the effective administration of justice.

The Court consists of a High Court, a Circuit Court and a District Court judge.

Appeals are to the Court of Appeal.

Internment
This Act allows the Government to bring internment without trial into force. The Minister for Justice may order the detention of persons deemed dangerous to state security. It also establishes an independent appeals commission to which prisoners can apply for release by making the case that they are not a threat to public safety. This was used during the Second World War and introduced in 1957 during the IRA Border Campaign.

References

External links
Offences Against the State Act, 1939
Offences Against the State (Amendment) Act, 1972
Offences Against the State (Amendment) Act, 1985
Offences Against the State (Amendment) Act, 1998

Acts of the Oireachtas of the 1930s
Acts of the Oireachtas of the 1970s
Acts of the Oireachtas of the 1980s
Acts of the Oireachtas of the 1990s
1939 in Irish law
1972 in Irish law
1985 in Irish law
1998 in Irish law
Treason in Ireland
Emergency laws in the Republic of Ireland